The 2015 FSP Gold River Women's Challenger is a professional tennis tournament played on outdoor hard courts. It is the fourth edition of the tournament and part of the 2015 ITF Women's Circuit, offering a total of $50,000 in prize money. It takes place in Sacramento, United States, on 20–26 July 2015.

Singles main draw entrants

Seeds 

 1 Rankings as of 13 July 2015

Other entrants 
The following players received wildcards into the singles main draw:
  Robin Anderson
  Brooke Austin
  Jamie Loeb
  Karina Kristina Vyrlan

The following players received entry from the qualifying draw:
  Nicole Frenkel
  Michaela Gordon
  Mari Osaka
  Ashley Weinhold

The following player received entry by a lucky loser spot:
  Kelly Chen

Champions

Singles

 Anhelina Kalinina def.  An-Sophie Mestach, 4–6, 6–4, 6–3

Doubles

 Ashley Weinhold /  Caitlin Whoriskey def.  Nao Hibino /  Rosie Johanson, 6–4, 3–6, [14–12]

External links 
 2015 FSP Gold River Women's Challenger at ITFtennis.com
 Official website 

2015 ITF Women's Circuit
FSP Gold River Women's Challenger
2015 in sports in California
2015 in American tennis